Harimau Muda is a former Malaysia national under-22 football team. The squad is the feeder team for senior national football team. The club is managed by the Football Association of Malaysia.
After winning the Premier League in 2009, the club were split into two teams, Harimau Muda A and Harimau Muda B due to schedule conflicts between league and international matches.
Harimau Muda was reinstated in 2015 by combining Harimau Muda A and B back into a single U-22 team with the exception of Harimau Muda C which still plays in FAM League. On 25 November 2015, it was confirmed that the Harimau Muda has disbanded by FAM which means all the player from Harimau Muda A, Harimau Muda B and Harimau Muda C will be returned to their own state.

History 
The team is aimed at developing Malaysian youth players.

The name "Harimau Muda" means "Young Tigers" in Malay.

Premier League (2007) 
Harimau Muda was made up of Under-21 players from across Malaysia, mainly chosen from the SSBJ football team and in the President Cup. Harimau Muda first participated in the Premier League Malaysia 2007-08. Harimau Muda's performance did not go as the Football Association of Malaysia expected, with the club finishing 8th in the 2007–08 season.

The FAM considered dissolving the club, but gave Harimau Muda a second chance to participate in the 2008/09 Premier League season, but this time with more experienced, and better players. Harimau Muda proved to FAM that they did not deserve to be dissolved, as their Manager Ong Kim Swee led the Harimau Muda team into winning the 2008/09 Premier League season, losing only 2 matches on the way.

Following the club's split into two teams, Harimau Muda was not allowed to be promoted into the Malaysia Super League. The Football Association of Malaysia gave Harimau Muda B a spot in the Malaysia Premier League later on.

Club splitting (2009) 
Owing to international duties in 2009, the Malaysia national U-21 team was needed to participate in the 2010 AFC U-19 Championship qualification. But they also needed to participate in the Premier League Malaysia and the Malaysia FA Cup 2009. This cause a major schedule conflict that posed a great problem for the Football Association of Malaysia.

In July 2009, the Harimau Muda were split into two teams. Harimau Muda A and Harimau Muda B. Harimau Muda B was sent to Zibo, China to participate in the 2010 AFC U-19 Championship qualification and Harimau Muda A was to participate in the Premier League and the FA Cup.

Harimau Muda B continued to participate half of the 2008–09 Premier League and the FA Cup with only reserves players, SSBJ football team players and mostly loaned age under 21 players from the President Cup, while the key players were with Harimau Muda A. with a combination of reserves players and loaned players, Harimau Muda B manage to play well in the league with the management of the assistant coach.

When Harimau Muda A returned to Malaysia, they combined and won the 2008–09 Premier League.

Football Association of Malaysia officially split the team into two teams after the 2008–09 Premier League finished in order to avoid another major schedule conflict.

Comeback (2015) 

Youth and Sports Minister Khairy Jamaluddin, former FAM's Deputy President has stated that the Football Association of Malaysia (FAM) must disband the Harimau Muda system, stating the Harimau Muda system is no longer relevant, it was not planned for the long term, and the state football associations should take the responsibility to groom potential players. However, he does not know that Japan use the same method of Harimau Muda concept. Japan U22 also participate in a league which is J3 in their local scene. The difference is the Japanese did not have fixed players. They have 200 players registered and can be called up any time to duel in J3 matches. By doing so, the competition for U22 places is more fiery and open.

Honours 
 Malaysia Premier League
 Winners (1): 2009
 Bangabandhu Cup
 Winners (1): 2015

Competition records

Bangabandhu Gold Cup

Staff and coach 
 Team Manager:
 Assistant manager:
 Head coach:
 Assistant coach:
 Goalkeeper coach:
 Physio         :
 Fitness coach  :

See also 
 Harimau Muda A
 Harimau Muda B
 Harimau Muda C

References

External links 
 Football Association of Malaysia
 Harimau Muda News

Malaysia national football team
Association football clubs established in 2007
Defunct football clubs in Malaysia
2007 establishments in Malaysia
Singapore Premier League clubs
2015 disestablishments in Malaysia
Association football clubs disestablished in 2015